Etobicoke was a federal electoral district represented in the House of Commons of Canada from 1968 to 1979. It was located in the province of Ontario. This riding was created in 1966 from parts of York—Humber riding.

The electoral district was abolished in 1976 when it was redistributed between Etobicoke Centre, Etobicoke North, Etobicoke—Lakeshore, York South—Weston and York West ridings.

Members of Parliament

This riding has elected the following Members of Parliament:

Election results

See also 

 List of Canadian federal electoral districts
 Past Canadian electoral districts

External links 
Riding history from the Library of Parliament

Former federal electoral districts of Ontario
Federal electoral districts of Toronto